Deniz Dağdelen (born 18 July 1997) is a Turkish taekwondo athlete.

Career 
In 2022, Deniz Dağdelen won one of the bronze medals in 54 kg at the 2022 European Taekwondo Championships held in Manchester, England.

References 

Living people
1997 births
Turkish male taekwondo practitioners
European Taekwondo Championships medalists
Islamic Solidarity Games medalists in taekwondo
Islamic Solidarity Games competitors for Turkey
21st-century Turkish people